Gordon Bay Provincial Park is a provincial park in British Columbia, Canada.

Geography
Gordon Bay is located on the western shore of the south end of Cowichan Lake.  The 49-hectare park of second-growth Douglas fir forest is in one of Vancouver Island's sunniest valleys, and is a popular campsite in the Cowichan Valley area.  There are many species of birds, such as juncos, Steller's jays and chestnut-backed chickadees as well as mergansers and golden eye ducks.  Wildlife includes deer, raccoons and red squirrels. Rainbow, Dolly Varden, and cutthroat trout live in the lake, and chum, coho and spring salmon spawn in the lake and in its tributaries. Steelhead spawn in the Cowichan River.

References

External links
BC Parks - Gordon Bay Provincial Park, Cowichan Lake

Provincial parks of British Columbia
Cowichan Valley
Year of establishment missing